Stéphane Millereau (born 26 August 1976) is a retired French football midfielder.

References

1976 births
Living people
French footballers
Ligue 2 players
Swiss Super League players
FC Mulhouse players
Quimper Kerfeunteun F.C. players
Étoile Carouge FC players
Football Bourg-en-Bresse Péronnas 01 players
USL Dunkerque players
Olympique Alès players
AS Cherbourg Football players
FC Sète 34 players
Pau FC players
FC Martigues players
AS Béziers Hérault (football) players
Association football midfielders
French expatriate footballers
Expatriate footballers in Switzerland
French expatriate sportspeople in Switzerland